The South Africa men's national under-20 ice hockey team is the national under-20 ice hockey team of South Africa. The team is controlled by the South African Ice Hockey Federation and a member of the International Ice Hockey Federation (IIHF).

History
South Africa played its first game in 1996 against Yugoslavia during the Group D tournament of the 1996 World Junior Ice Hockey Championships. South Africa lost the game 8–1. South Africa continued to play in Group D during the World Junior Ice Hockey Championships until 2001 where the International Ice Hockey Federation changed to playing format. South Africa was reseeded into the newly formed Division III tournament of the World Junior Ice Hockey Championships. In 2002 South Africa gained promotion to Division II due to a restructuring that would increase the number of teams in Division II from eight to twelve. The following year South Africa suffered their largest defeat against Great Britain during the 2003 World Junior Ice Hockey Championships Division II Group A tournament. Great Britain shutout South Africa winning the game 21–0. In 2004 South Africa finished last in their Division II Group B tournament and were relegated to Division III for the following year.

South Africa did not participate in the following two World Championships, but returned to Division III for the 2008 World Junior Ice Hockey Championships, finishing fifth in the group of seven.

International competitions

World Junior Championships

References

External links
South African Ice Hockey Association

Junior national ice hockey teams
ice hockey